Dorsum Thera is a wrinkle ridge at  in Mare Imbrium on the Moon. It is approximately 7 km long. 

NASA proposed the dorsum to be named in honour of Anthony Kontaratos' contribution to the space program (notably rescue of Apollo 13 mission). Nevertheless, Dr. Kontaratos asked for the dorsum to be named 'Thera', after his place of origin (Thera - also known as Santorini, Greece). It was named in 1976.

To the northeast are Courtney crater and Catena Yuri.  To the southwest is Mons Vinogradov.  The nearest prominent crater is Euler located to the south-southeast.

References

Ridges on the Moon
Mare Imbrium